Anaëlle Wiard (born 23 March 1991) is a Belgian football, futsal and beach soccer player, who has made 16 appearances for the Belgium women's national football team.

Club career
Wiard plays as a striker. In 2010, she transferred to Anderlecht. She played in the Anderlecht team that lost the 2016 Belgian Women's Cup Final to Lierse SK; she scored Anderlecht's only goal in the final, as they lost 2–1. In 2017, Wiard was injured in a match against Standard Liège, and was forced to miss the last few matches of the season. In 2018, she signed for Oud-Heverlee Leuven from Standard Liège; she was one of 20 signings that OH Leuven made, and one of five signings from Standard Liège. That year, she scored a hat-trick for OH Leuven in a match against KSK Heist.

In July 2020, she signed for Belgian futsal club FP Halle-Gooik. She continued to play football for Eendracht Aalst alongside her futsal role. In September 2020, she played for beach soccer team New Team Brussels in the Beach Soccer Champions League. She had been the team's top scorer in the C1 league. She had taken up the sport in June, and was the tournaments' top scorer. Wiard chose to miss Eendracht Aalst football matches to attend the tournament. In November 2020, she sustained a cruciate ligament injury that sidelined her for six months. It was the third cruciate ligament injury of her career. In May 2021, Wiard signed a one-year contract extension with Eendracht Aalst.

International career
Wiard has made 16 appearances for the Belgium women's national football team, scoring five goals. She was part of the Belgian squad at the 2015 Cyprus Women's Cup.

Personal life
Aside from football, Wiard works as a physical education teacher. She is also a coach of an under-9s boys football team in Watermael-Boitsfort.

References

External links
 
 
 
 Eendracht Aalst
 Walfoot
 Beach Soccer profile

1991 births
Living people
Belgian women's footballers
Belgium women's international footballers
Standard Liège (women) players
Oud-Heverlee Leuven (women) players
RSC Anderlecht (women) players
Belgian women's futsal players
Belgian beach soccer players
Women's association football forwards